Taras Ivanovych Kacharaba (born 7 January 1995) is a Ukrainian professional footballer who plays as a centre-back for Slavia Prague.

Club career
Kacharaba was born in Zhydachiv, Lviv Oblast, Ukraine. He is a product of the UFK Lviv youth sportive school and signed a contract with FC Shakhtar Donetsk in the Ukrainian Premier League in 2012.

International career
He was called up to play for the 23-man squad of the Ukraine national under-19 football team by trainer Oleksandr Petrakov in the UEFA European Under-19 Championship in July 2014.

He made his Ukraine national football team debut on 8 September 2021 in a friendly against the Czech Republic, a 1–1 away draw.

Career statistics

Club

International

References

External links
 
 
 

1995 births
Living people
People from Zhydachiv
Ukrainian footballers
Association football defenders
Ukraine international footballers
Ukraine youth international footballers
Ukraine under-21 international footballers
Ukrainian Premier League players
Ukrainian Second League players
Czech First League players
FC Shakhtar-3 Donetsk players
FC Shakhtar Donetsk players
FC Hoverla Uzhhorod players
FC Zirka Kropyvnytskyi players
FC Slovan Liberec players
SK Slavia Prague players
Ukrainian expatriate footballers
Expatriate footballers in the Czech Republic
Ukrainian expatriate sportspeople in the Czech Republic
Sportspeople from Lviv Oblast